John Colin Stillwell (born 1942) is an Australian mathematician on the faculties of the University of San Francisco and Monash University.

Biography

He was born in Melbourne, Australia and lived there until he went to the Massachusetts Institute of Technology for his doctorate.  He received his PhD from MIT in 1970, working under Hartley Rogers, Jr who had himself worked under Alonzo Church. From 1970 until 2001 he taught at Monash University back in Australia and in 2002 began teaching in San Francisco.

Honors
In 2005, Stillwell was the recipient of the Mathematical Association of America's prestigious Chauvenet Prize for his article “The Story of the 120-Cell,” Notices of the AMS, January 2001, pp. 17–24. In 2012 he became a fellow of the American Mathematical Society.

Works

Books
Stillwell is the author of many textbooks and other books on mathematics including:
Classical Topology and Combinatorial Group Theory, 1980, 
Mathematics and Its History, 1989, 3rd edition 2010,  
Geometry of Surfaces, 1992, 
Elements of Algebra: Geometry, Numbers, Equations, 1994, 
Numbers and Geometry, 1998, 
Elements of Number Theory, 2003, 
The Four Pillars of Geometry, 2005, 
Yearning for the Impossible: The Surprising Truths of Mathematics, 2006, 
Naive Lie Theory, 2008, 
Roads to Infinity, 2010, 
The Real Numbers: An Introduction to Set Theory and Analysis, 2013, 
Elements of Mathematics: From Euclid to Gödel, 2016, 
Reverse Mathematics: Proofs from the Inside Out, 2018, 
A Concise History of Mathematics for Philosophers, 2019, 
The Story of Proof: Logic and the History of Mathematics, 2022,

Selected articles

References

1942 births
Living people
Massachusetts Institute of Technology alumni
Academic staff of Monash University
University of San Francisco faculty
Australian mathematicians
Fellows of the American Mathematical Society
Australian textbook writers
People from Melbourne
Group theorists
Topologists
University of Melbourne alumni